The Hope may refer to:

Film
 The Hope (1920 film), 1920 comedy film

Literature
 The Hope (novel), a novel by Herman Wouk

Music
 The Hope (album), an album by The Sign
 The Hope (Magle), a choral work by Frederik Magle
 Hatikvah (The Hope), the national anthem of Israel
 "La Espero" ("The Hope"), an Esperanto anthem

Television
The Hope, a television series produced by The 700 Club Interactive, about the formation and history of Israel post-World War II

Visual art
 The Hope (sculpture), outdoor sculpture in Israel

See also
 Hope (disambiguation)